S'Express (pronounced ess-express; sometimes spelled S'Xpress or S-Express) were a British dance music act from the late 1980s, who had one of the earliest commercial successes in the acid house genre.

"Theme from S'Express", which contained elements from Rose Royce's "Is It Love You're After", was one of the earliest recordings to capitalize on the emergence of sampling culture. The song went to number one in the UK Singles Chart for two weeks in April 1988. It made the Hot Dance Club Play chart in the US (also scraping into the U.S. Billboard Hot 100 at number 91). In 2016 Mark Moore released a remix album called Enjoy This Trip which retooled S’Express’s music for the 21st century through working with guests such as Punks Jump Up and Chris & Cosey.

Biography
The main player in the act was disc jockey and producer Mark Moore. In 1989, the group released its debut album, Original Soundtrack, which featured a line-up of Moore, Pascal Gabriel, Jocasta, Mark D, Linda Love, and Michellé.  The album consisted of slightly longer versions of S-Express's "Theme", its follow-up hits "Superfly Guy" (UK No. 5) and a cover version of Sly and the Family Stone's "Hey Music Lover" (UK No. 6; its b-side was remixed by minimalist composer Philip Glass).

By the release of the second album Intercourse, the act was reduced to a duo of Moore with new vocalist and DJ Sonique. Although not as successful as its debut, Intercourse spawned several mid-charting UK singles and club hits, including "Nothing to Lose", co-written with Martin Gordon, as were several other tunes on the record.  Sonique, already a successful DJ, eventually embarked on a solo career and produced one of the biggest club hits of the late 1990s ("It Feels So Good"). Moore went on to release many singles, remixes and albums on his own and also formed the band Needledust.

Discography

Albums

Studio albums

Compilation albums

EPs

Singles

Notes

References

Further reading

External links
 Mark Moore's official website
 Sonique
 Mark Moore/S'Express Facebook
 Mark Moore's Twitter
 Discogs: S'Express
 S'Express at WorldMusicDatabase

English house music groups
English electronic music groups
English dance music groups
Acid house groups
Sire Records artists
Capitol Records artists
Musical groups established in 1988
Musical groups from London
DJs from London
Kitsuné artists
Rhythm King artists